Sebastian Korda, the son of 1998 men's singles champion Petr Korda, won the boys' singles tennis title at the 2018 Australian Open, defeating Tseng Chun-hsin in the final, 7–6(8–6), 6–4.

Zsombor Piros was the defending champion but chose to participate in the men's singles qualifying as a wild card, lost to Bjorn Fratangelo in the second round.

Seeds

Draw

Finals

Top half

Section 1

Section 2

Bottom half

Section 3

Section 4

Qualifying

Seeds

Qualifiers

Lucky losers

Draw

First qualifier

Second qualifier

Third qualifier

Fourth qualifier

Fifth qualifier

Sixth qualifier

Seventh qualifier

Eighth qualifier

External links 
 Main draw at ausopen.com
 Draw at itftennis.com

Boys' Singles
Australian Open, 2018 Boys' Singles